HMS Levant was a 20-gun Cyrus-class sixth rate of the Royal Navy built by William Courtney, of Chester. She was one of five British warships that   captured or destroyed during the War of 1812. She was soon recaptured, and after 1817 was reclassified as a sloop of war. She was broken up in 1820.

Career

Levant was one of 16 ships of the Cyrus class that had the underwater lines of the French prize Bonne Citoyenne (though slightly reduced). Levant was launched in December 1813. Her first commander was Captain Alexander Jones (younger brother of Captain Charles Jones) who was replaced by George Douglas on 28 April 1814. Under Douglas, Levant travelled from England to Quebec and then to Gibraltar.

Although peace had already been declared Constitution had not received official information about the Treaty of Ghent. Cyane and Levant were able to fire heavier broadsides than Constitution but were still outgunned by range and gun power by the American vessel. With excellent seamanship Constitution outmanoeuvred both ships and forced Cyane to surrender first. After placing a prize crew on board Cyane, Stewart chased Levant down. The sloop surrendered after two broadsides fired by the American vessel and was also taken a prize. With the help of the British prisoners all three ships set course for the Cape Verde Islands.

A British squadron under Commodore George Collier eventually sighted Constitution in heavy weather off Porto Praya on 11 March 1815.  She was proceeding with her two prizes. Due to the weather and some confusion, Constitution eluded the British.

Fire from  led Levants crew to run her ashore, where  then captured her. Collier eventually left Acasta and  windward of Barbados while he searched for Constitution. However, she had returned to port, thus avoiding an engagement.
 
Because Portugal was unable to maintain its neutrality on its (former) soil the Portuguese government compensated the United States for the loss of Levant.

Captain John Sheridan commanded Levant from June 1815 until she was laid up in Chatham in November that year.

Fate
Levant was intended to be repaired and returned to service in August 1820, but this was not carried out and she was broken up by 9 October 1820. Her captured ensign was on display at Mahan Hall at the U.S. Naval Academy, but was removed on 27 February 2018 for preservation.

Notes

Citations

References
Gossett, William Patrick (1986) The lost ships of the Royal Navy, 1793-1900. (London: Mansell). 

 Martin, Tyrone G. (2003) A Most Fortunate Ship. A Narrative History Of Old Ironsides. Revised Edition.

External links
 
 USS Constitution Museum
 Age of Nelson

 

1813 ships
Ships built in England
Cyrus-class post ships
Captured ships
War of 1812 ships of the United Kingdom